Tropaeolum minus, the dwarf nasturtium is a species of perennial plant in the Tropaeolaceae family. It is endemic to mountainous regions of Ecuador and Peru.

References

minus